The Nigua River is a river of Salinas, Puerto Rico, which flows south to Rincón Bay in Santa Isabel, Puerto Rico.

Flood control project
In mid 2018, the United States Army Corps of Engineers announced it would be undertaking a major flood control project of the river, with a $60 million budget.

See also

List of rivers of Puerto Rico

References

External links
 USGS Hydrologic Unit Map – Caribbean Region (1974)
Rios de Puerto Rico

Rivers of Puerto Rico